The Avions Fairey Belfair, also known as the Tipsy Belfair after its designer, Ernest Oscar Tips, was a two-seat light aircraft built in Belgium following World War II.

Design and development

The Belfair was based on the Tipsy B built before the war, but featured a fully enclosed cabin. It was a low-wing cantilever monoplane of conventional configuration with exceptionally clean lines. It was fitted with tailwheel undercarriage with spatted mainwheels.

The aircraft boasted splendid performance, twice breaking the world distance record for aircraft in its class (FAI class 1A - under 500 kg). The first of these flights was made by Albert van Cothem on 21 August 1950 and covered . Both records were set in the same aircraft, construction number 533, registration OO-TIC.

Unfortunately, the Belfair was a victim of the glut of light aircraft on the market following World War II. The aircraft was priced at BEF 200,000, when war-surplus Piper Cubs and similar aircraft were selling for around BEF 30,000. Consequently, although six airframes past the prototype were under construction, only three had been completed when Tips made the decision that the aircraft was simply not commercially viable and sold the remaining airframes "as is". They were purchased by D. Heaton of Speeton, Yorkshire and completed in the UK, with a further aircraft converted from a prewar Tipsy Trainer to the same standard. One of these aircraft (c/n 535, G-APIE, ex OO-TIE) was still flying in 2015, while another (c/n 536, G-APOD) was under restoration as of 2001.

Specifications

See also

Notes

References

 
 
 Oliver Holmes photography
 The Ultimate Tipsy Site

Single-engined tractor aircraft
1940s Belgian civil utility aircraft
Belfair
Low-wing aircraft
Aircraft first flown in 1946
Belfair